Alawataimë enï is a Wayana village situated on the Lawa River in French Guiana.

Geography 
Alawataimë enï lies to the northeast of the village of Taluwen and Epoja.

Notes

References 

Indigenous villages in French Guiana
Maripasoula
Villages in French Guiana